Waynesboro (formerly Flack) is an independent city in the Commonwealth of Virginia. It is a principal city of the Staunton-Waynesboro Metropolitan Statistical Area. Waynesboro is located in the Shenandoah Valley and is surrounded by Augusta County. As of the 2020 census, the population was 22,196.

History 

Located in the British Colony of Virginia, even after the American Revolution and independence and statehood for the Commonwealth of Virginia, the areas west of the Appalachian and Blue Ridge Mountains were known as the frontier. Travel by wagon over the mountains was considered to be nearly impossible except where nature afforded some gap between them. Until after the Civil War, Jarmans Gap, only some six miles northeast of Waynesboro, was the major crossing of the Blue Ridge Mountains in that area, making Waynesboro a convenient location for a stop for many who sought to travel west.

In the mid-18th century, the Waynesboro area was commonly referred to as Teasville (or Teesville). Shortly after U.S. Army General Anthony Wayne's significant victory at Battle of Fallen Timbers in 1794 during the Northwest Indian War, the area began to be called Waynesborough. Many settlers to the area at the time originated from Pennsylvania. General Wayne's well-known popularity with Pennsylvanians is suspected to have helped contribute to this naming.

As early as 1798, the current downtown area was plotted and sold. On January 8, 1801, the town of Waynesborough was officially recognized by the state of Virginia and was incorporated by 1834.

Some of the remaining buildings from this period of its history include the Plumb House (now a museum open for tours seasonally) and the Coiner-Quesenbury House, built in 1806, believed to be the first brick house built in the town, which is still standing on Main Street.

Population growth in the town was slow at first. In 1810, the town had a population of 250, and by 1860 that number had grown to 457. The town maintained a steady stream of visitors primarily due to its position on Three Notch'd Road, which connected Staunton to the west with Charlottesville and Richmond to the east. This road crossed the Blue Ridge Mountains through Jarman's Gap. Additionally, a railroad tunnel was constructed through Rockfish Gap a short time before the Civil War began. This was to establish Rockfish Gap as the major crossing through the mountains between Waynesboro and Charlottesville.

On March 2, 1865, Waynesboro was the site of the last battle of the Civil War for the Confederate Lt. General Jubal A. Early. The Battle of Waynesboro lasted twenty minutes, and was a final blow for the Confederate Army in the Shenandoah Valley. Sometime after, General Early relinquished the town and the valley to General Philip Sheridan. Many of the buildings from this period still show damage from the battle. During and after the war, casualties from the nearby Valley Campaign and other battles were buried in Ridgeview Cemetery where the Waynesboro Confederate Monument lists and commemorates their names and states.

After the war, the Waynesboro area became the junction of two important railroad lines: an east-to-west track (operated by the Chesapeake and Ohio Railway) and a north-south trunk line (of the Shenandoah Valley Railroad, which soon became the Norfolk and Western Railway). The tracks intersected near Waynesboro, giving the site the nickname of the "Iron Cross." The transportation advantages coming from the Iron Cross fueled great hopes for economic development.  

In a flurry of land speculation, land lots to the east of Waynesboro, mostly on the east side of South River, were plotted and sold in 1890.  Within that year, the area was incorporated as the Town of Basic City. An opera house, a wide boulevard called Commerce Avenue, and the upscale Hotel Brunswick were built there. A friendly rivalry soon developed between the two towns with each attempting to outdo the other regarding their development. The overall population from May 1, 1890, to May 1 of 1891 rose 150% (from 1,000 people to 2,500). An important difference between the two was that, unlike Basic City, Waynesboro had implemented restrictive laws banning the sale of alcohol. Effects of the Panic of 1896 abruptly dried up the boomtown investment in Basic City; grand plans for more hotels and manufacturing complexes were scuttled. The established blocks of small-size land plots meant for worker housing remain, and today the former Basic City area is largely low-income housing.

Waynesboro steadily prospered and circa 1900-1920 many spacious houses were built on a scenic hill that was gridded into the "Tree Streets" neighborhood, with residential lanes named Oak Avenue, Chestnut Avenue, Poplar Avenue, and the like. In 1923, Waynesboro and Basic City consolidated into a single town to be called Waynesboro-Basic. Later, officials dropped Basic and the name became Waynesboro, with the former Basic City disappearing as one of the "lost towns of Virginia." Since 1924, Waynesboro has made numerous territorial acquisitions from areas of Augusta County through annexation and officially became an independent city in 1948. In 2005, Waynesboro established a new charter, repealing one in place since 1948.

Geography
Waynesboro is located at  (38.069874, -78.894517). It is 1,305 feet above sea level.

Waynesboro is located in the Shenandoah Valley, The South River, a tributary of the Shenandoah River, flows through the city.

Climate

Demographics

2020 census

Note: the US Census treats Hispanic/Latino as an ethnic category. This table excludes Latinos from the racial categories and assigns them to a separate category. Hispanics/Latinos can be of any race.

2010 Census
As of the census of 2010, there were 21,006 people, 8,903 households, and 5,589 families residing in the city. The population density was 1,364 people per square mile (527.8/km2). There were 9,717 housing units at an average density of 631 per square mile (244.1/km2). The racial makeup of the city was 82.2% White, 10.6% African American, 0.3% Native American, 0.7% Asian, 0.02% Pacific Islander, 2.9% from other races, and 3.2% from two or more races. Hispanic or Latino of any race were 6.4% of the population.

There were 8,903 households, of which 27.1% had children under the age of 18 living with them, 42.4% were married couples living together, 15.3% had a female householder with no husband present, and 37.2% were non-families. 30.8% of all households were made up of individuals, and 11.9% had someone living alone who was 65 years of age or older. The average household size was 2.34 and the average family size was 2.90.

In the city, the population was spread out, with 23.3% under the age of 18, 8.2% from 18 to 24, 25.8% from 25 to 44, 25.7% from 45 to 64, and 17.0% who were 65 years of age or older. The median age was 38.8 years. For every 100 females, there were 91.5 males. For every 100 females age eighteen and over, there were 85.7 males.

The median income for a household in the city was $41,077, and the median income for a family was $55,668. Males had a median income of $36,013 versus $30,699 for females. The per capita income for the city was $24,372. About 12.9% of families and 18.0% of the population were below the poverty line, including 27.6% of those under age 18 and 11.0% of those age 65 or over.

Economy 
A large former DuPont plant and the associated Benger Laboratory where spandex was invented (under the brand name Lycra), as well as a large textile mill called Wayn-Tex (now owned by Mohawk Industries), were significant employers for residents through much of the 20th century. The DuPont plant was later sold to Koch Industries as part of the subsidiary company Invista. In January 2019, the plant was again sold to Chinese luxury apparel firm Shandong Ruyi Group and rebranded as The Lycra Company. A General Electric site on the northeast side, which made relays and later computer printers, was also a substantial employer. Waynesboro was home to the corporate headquarters of nTelos (a regional wireless and telecommunications company serving Virginia, West Virginia, North Carolina, Tennessee, Kentucky, and Ohio) before that company's merger with Shentel. Tourism, industrial production, and retail remain vital to the Waynesboro economy.

Arts and culture

Film and television 
Two movies have filmed scenes in Waynesboro: Toy Soldiers (1991) and Evan Almighty (2007). The city has been mentioned several times on television series The Waltons.

Architecture 
Nearby is Swannanoa palace, which was listed on the National Register of Historic Places in 1969.

Sports 
The Generals of the Valley Baseball League play there.

Parks and recreation 

Near Waynesboro, is the west portal and visitor parking for the historical Blue Ridge Tunnel, which opened to the public as a linear park in 2021.

Government 
Like the rest of the Shenandoah Valley, Waynesboro is a traditionally Republican stronghold. Despite improved Democratic performance over time, Waynesboro has remained Republican even since the 2008 presidential election, which marked the beginning of a string of Democratic presidential victories in other Valley independent cities such as Harrisonburg, Staunton, and Winchester. Joe Biden, in 2020, received the highest percentage (46.3%) of Waynesboro votes for any Democratic presidential candidate in 56 years, but still received 546 fewer votes than then-president Donald Trump.

Education 
The Waynesboro City Public Schools system serves the area and operates Waynesboro High School. Waynesboro is the home of Fishburne Military School, an all-male private military boarding school for grades 8 through 12.

Infrastructure

Transportation

Intercity rail 
The city is served by two freight rail lines, owned by Norfolk Southern and CSX. The intersection of the two lines is known as "The Iron Cross," a historically significant symbol of the city's economic growth.

Freeways and primary routes 
The main highway through Waynesboro is Interstate 64, which runs east to west across much of Virginia. It also has a junction with Interstate 81 just to the west of Waynesboro, the main north-south highway across western Virginia. Additional highways serving Waynesboro include U.S. Route 250, U.S. Route 340, and Virginia State Route 254.

Media
Waynesboro's local newspaper is The News Virginian.

Notable people

Cory Alexander, NBA basketball player and ACC Network announcer
Ann Bedsole, politician, businesswoman, community activist, and philanthropist
Shonn Bell, a professional football player
Kenny Brooks, head coach of the Virginia Tech women's basketball team
Carrie Buck, plaintiff in the United States Supreme Court case Buck v. Bell that dealt with forced sterilization
Joseph Burns, U.S. Representative 
Ronnie R. Campbell, politician, Virginia House of Delegates
Jeff Ray Clark, American economist
Mark Cline, American artist and entertainer
Shawn Decker, writer and HIV/AIDS speaker
Lew DeWitt, singer and songwriter, member of The Statler Brothers
Earl Hamner Jr., television writer and producer
John A. Harman, Confederate States Army officer, chief quartermaster of the Army of Northern Virginia.
William Henry Harman, Confederate general
Reggie Harris, MLB baseball player
Mary Louise Hawkins, air evacuation flight nurse who earned the Distinguished Flying Cross during World War II
Lejaren Hiller, composer
Nikki Hornsby, singer and songwriter
Mikkel Borlaug Johnson, physicist
Kid Kash, professional wrestler
Elizabeth Massie, American horror author
Richards Miller, one of the founders of the Venturing (Boy Scouts of America) program
P. Buckley Moss, artist
William Henry Sheppard, Presbyterian missionary to Africa
Anne Tompkins, United States Attorney
John Wetzel, former professional basketball player and coach

References

Further reading 
 Hawke, George, A History of Waynesboro to 1900, Waynesboro Historical Commission, 1997
 Bowman, Curtis, Waynesboro Days of Yore: Volumes I and II, McClung Companies, Inc, Waynesboro, 1992

External links 

 
 Waynesboro Tourism
 Waynesboro City Public Schools

 
Cities in Virginia
Populated places established in 1801
1801 establishments in Virginia
Western Virginia